Ophthalmoptera is a genus of picture-winged flies in the family Ulidiidae.

Species
 Ophthalmoptera bipunctata
 Ophthalmoptera elegans
 Ophthalmoptera innotata
 Ophthalmoptera longipennis
 Ophthalmoptera undulata

References

Ulidiidae
Muscomorpha genera